Different Animals is the third studio album by American progressive metalcore band Volumes, released on June 9, 2017 through Fearless Records. It is the first album to feature former Bury Your Dead vocalist Myke Terry as co-vocalist, and the only album to not feature founding co-vocalist Michael Barr. The album was also the final studio album with co-vocalist Gus Farias and guitarist Diego Farias.

Track listing

Personnel
Volumes
 Myke Terry – lead vocals
 Gus Farias – unclean vocals, rapping
 Diego Farias – guitars, programming, production, engineering 
 Raad Soudani – bass, programming 
 Nick Ursich – drums

Additional musicians
 Pouya – guest rapping on track 9, "On Her Mind"

Additional personnel
 Brandon Paddock – production, programming, engineering 
 Chris Athens – mastering
 Kyle Black – mixing, additional engineering

Charts

References

2017 albums
Volumes (band) albums
Fearless Records albums